San Diego, a major coastal city in southern California has over 200 high-rises, mainly in the central business district of Downtown San Diego. In the 1970s, the Federal Aviation Administration (FAA) began restricting downtown building height to maximum of  within a  radius of San Diego International Airport's single runway.

History
The history of skyscrapers in San Diego began with the completion of the U.S. Grant Hotel in 1910. During the 1990s, the city was compared to a "handful of tools in a scarcely stocked toolbox" and a "mouth with a lot of missing teeth". Development in the late 1990s and 2000s led to many new high-rises, mainly residential skyscrapers. Many of these new residential buildings are pairs of twin towers.

, San Diego is ranked 92nd in the world and 3rd in California with its 162 high-rises. However, due to the FAA height restriction, none of San Diego's buildings are within the top 100 tallest buildings in the United States. , there are around 20 buildings that have been proposed, approved, or are currently undergoing construction which will join the tallest buildings in San Diego (over 300 feet).

Cityscape

Tallest buildings

This includes spires and architectural details but does not include antenna masts. The "Year" column indicates the year in which a building was completed.

Tallest under construction
There is one building under construction in San Diego that is planned to rise at least  (as of January 2022). Under construction buildings that have already been topped out are also included.

Timeline of tallest buildings
There have been five buildings that have held the title of tallest building in San Diego including the current tallest building, the One America Plaza.

Notes

See also

List of tallest buildings in California

References
General

Specific

External links

 "San Diego" and skyscraper diagram at SkyscraperPage
"San Diego" at the Council on Tall Buildings and Urban Habitat

San Diego
San Diego
 
Buildings